The Gay Alliance Toward Equality, or GATE, was one of the first Canadian gay liberation groups.

Formed in spring 1971 in Vancouver, British Columbia by Maurice Flood, GATE was the first Canadian gay group to explicitly discuss and plan civil rights strategies for achieving gay and lesbian equality under Canadian law. Autonomous groups with the same name were subsequently set up in other cities in Canada, including Edmonton and Toronto; in some cities, the local GATE chapter was the first locally oriented LGBT organization to be established.

One of the first high-profile cases launched for gay rights in Canada was launched by the Vancouver chapter of GATE in response to the Vancouver Sun's refusal to allow for a paid advertisement for the GATE newspaper, Gay Tide. This would become the first gay rights case to reach the Supreme Court of Canada, although the judges ruled 6-3 in favour of the Vancouver Sun.

Other prominent activities taken on by the group included picketing various human rights commissions over the lack of human rights protection for sexual orientation under Canadian law, and taking on an advocacy role in the wrongful dismissal suit of John Damien when the Ontario Racing Commission fired him as a racing steward because of his sexuality.

The Toronto group led a successful campaign in 1973 to lobby Toronto City Council to adopt a policy forbidding discrimination on the basis of sexual orientation in municipal hiring, making the city the first jurisdiction in Canada to do so.

In its later years, GATE also undertook some activities as a political party. One activist, Robert Douglas Cook, ran as a GATE candidate in British Columbia's 1979 provincial election, in the electoral district of West Vancouver-Howe Sound. He has been credited by media sources in the past as the first openly gay candidate ever to run for political office in Canadian history; however, he was merely the first to run as a candidate of a specifically gay-identified political organization, and was in fact preceded by at least two openly gay candidates for traditional political parties, and at least four openly gay candidates for non-partisan municipal offices.

The group dissolved in 1980.

See also

LGBT rights in Canada
List of LGBT rights organisations

References

External links
 Gay Alliance Toward Equality (Vancouver) fonds at The ArQuives: Canada's LGBTQ2+ Archives

Organizations established in 1971
Organizations disestablished in 1980
LGBT political advocacy groups in Canada
Provincial political parties in British Columbia
LGBT culture in Vancouver
LGBT history in Canada
Organizations based in Vancouver
1971 establishments in British Columbia
1980 disestablishments in Canada